Dong Cunrui (1929 - May 25, 1948) was a Chinese Communist soldier in the People's Liberation Army during the Chinese Civil War who blew himself up in order to destroy a Kuomintang bunker guarding an approach to an important bridge in Longhua County.

Death
Under heavy fire, he reached the bunker, but there was no place to effectively position the explosives. Reportedly shouting "For a new China!", he detonated the explosives he carried, killing himself and the defenders within the bunker. He was posthumously awarded three "Bravery Medals" and one "Mao Zedong Medal", and his squad was titled "Dong Cunrui Training Model Squad". 

His sacrifice was heavily publicized by the Communists, who called him a "hero" and "model communist", and he remains well known in China. He was depicted in a 1955 film Dong Cunrui directed by Guo Wei, and a 2009 TV miniseries titled For a new China, forward. His story was also published in national elementary Chinese textbooks.

See also
Lei Feng, another PLA soldier frequently depicted in Chinese propaganda
Zhang Side
Huang Jiguang
Qiu Shaoyun
Zuo Quan

References

External links
Dong Cunrui
 PLA honored models: Dong Cunrui
1955 Film Dong Cunrui
人民網對董存瑞的介紹

1929 births
1948 deaths
People from Zhangjiakou
People's Liberation Army personnel
Propaganda in China
D